Nzomo Mutuku is a former Kenyan C-Suite executive at the RBA. He served the organization as the chief executive officer from March 2017 to the end of his tenure in June 2022. He was also an ex-officio member of the board of directors. He died in London days after his retirement.

Career
Nzomo worked as an Economist at the Central Bank of Kenya for six years from the year 1994 before moving to RBA in 2000 as Chief Manager, Research and Development. After 13 years, he was seconded to the National Treasury & Planning as a senior adviser, the Financial sector in Jun 2013, and was acting Director in the Financial and Sectoral Affairs Department until Mar of the year 2017.

He returned to RBA in Apr 2017 as acting chief executive officer for 14 months before taking over fully until his retirement in Jun 2022. In September 2019 he was called upon to serve as the Interim chair of the African Pension Supervisors Forum.

Education
Nzomo held a Bachelor of Arts and Master of Arts degree in economics from the University of Nairobi. He earned a Certificate in Digital Money from the Fletcher School of Tufts University, and another certificate on Africa Climate Finance Leadership Programme from the University of Cambridge Institute for Sustainability Leadership. He was a Fellow of the Economist Society of Kenya.

References

External links
 Nzomo Mutuku at RBA
 Nzomo Mutuku at IRA
 Nzomo Mutuku at Obituary Kenya

1969 births
Living people
Kenyan chief executives
21st-century Kenyan economists
University of Nairobi alumni
The Fletcher School at Tufts University alumni
20th-century Kenyan economists